Alicerces Paulo Bartolomeu, also known as Ali Mango (born 10 February 1982), is an Angolan politician for UNITA and a member of the National Assembly of Angola. He is the secretary general of Juventude Revolucionária de Angola (JURA).

References

Living people
Members of the National Assembly (Angola)
UNITA politicians
1982 births